Eliakim is a moshav in northern Israel. Located in the Menashe Heights, it falls under the jurisdiction of Megiddo Regional Council.

History
The village was established in 1949 as a moshav by Jewish refugees from Yemen on the lands of the depopulated  Palestinian village of Umm az-Zinat, and was named after Jehoiakim (who was originally named Eliakim), a King of Judah (2 Kings 23:34). In 1970 it was converted to a communal settlement, but returned to being a moshav in 2008.

Notable residents
Boaz Mauda, winner of season 5 of Kokhav Nolad

References

Moshavim
Populated places established in 1949
Populated places in Northern District (Israel)
Yemeni-Jewish culture in Israel
1949 establishments in Israel